Gorno Količani is a village in the municipality of Studeničani, North Macedonia.

Demographics
According to the 2021 census, the village had a total of 248 inhabitants. Ethnic groups in the village include:
Albanians 195
Others 53

References

Villages in Studeničani Municipality
Albanian communities in North Macedonia